"The Battle of Godfrey's Cottage" is an episode in the British comedy series Dad's Army. It was originally transmitted on Saturday 8 March 1969.

Synopsis
The church bells are to be removed to provide metal for the war effort, so the vicar has one last ring before they are removed. After the church bells ring (which is the signal indicating the start of a German invasion), Mainwaring, Wilson, Jones, Frazer, Pike and Walker all go to Godfrey's cottage and start fighting the "Germans."

Plot
While most of the platoon are on their way to the cinema to see a training film, the church bells ring, and Mainwaring, Jones and Frazer take up a defensive position at Godfrey's cottage. Wilson, Pike, Walker and Sponge are unable to find the others, and, leaving Sponge behind at the command post, head to Godfrey's cottage. There they see Jones, wearing one of Godfrey's old German helmets, and fire at him. Meanwhile, Godfrey's sisters shake a tablecloth out of the window, which is interpreted by Wilson as a surrender. In the end, Sponge starts firing on Mainwaring and Wilson.

Cast

Arthur Lowe as Captain Mainwaring
John Le Mesurier as Sergeant Wilson
Clive Dunn as Lance Corporal Jones
John Laurie as Private Frazer
James Beck as Private Walker
Arnold Ridley as Private Godfrey
Ian Lavender as Private Pike
Janet Davies as Mrs Pike
Amy Dalby as Dolly
Nan Braunton as Cissy
Bill Pertwee as ARP Warden Hodges
Colin Bean as Private Sponge

Notes
This programme was formerly one of the missing Dad's Army episodes and was thought to be irretrievably lost for many years. However, in June 2001 this episode and Operation Kilt were returned to the BBC. The film cans were in a poor condition and the film itself had seriously deteriorated. Following restoration by BBC technicians, it was repeated.
This episode was originally titled 'The Battle of Mon Repos'.
This episode was repeated on 22 August 1969.
Amy Dalby, who featured as Dolly Godfrey, died on 10 March 1969 – two days after this episode first aired. She was replaced by Joan Cooper, Arthur Lowe's wife, when the character reappeared in later episodes.
This episode had the platoon preparing to go to the neighbouring town of Eastgate to watch the film "Next of Kin". This was a real British propaganda film made in 1942 to promote the British government message to the general public that "Careless talk costs lives". The film was released in May 1942, which helps to date the period of the second world war in which this episode was set.

Further reading

External links

References

Dad's Army radio episodes
Dad's Army (series 2) episodes
1969 British television episodes
Rediscovered television